Lucas Tao Kilmer Larsen, better known as Santorin, is a Danish professional League of Legends player who is the jungler for Team Liquid of the League of Legends Championship Series (LCS). He has also played for Team Coast, Team SoloMid, Team Ember and Team Huma. Santorin joined TSM in November 2014. He won the 2015 Spring NA LCS with TSM. On December 14, 2015, he was announced for Team Huma's North American League of Legends Challenger Series. On February 26, 2016, he was sold to Ember due to Huma's financial issues.

After a 9th place regular season finish  in the 2016 Summer NA LCS, and subsequent relegation match losses, Santorin left NRG.

Tournament results

Team SoloMid
 1st — 2015 Spring NA LCS 
 2nd — 2015 Summer NA LCS

NRG Esports
 5th — 2016 Spring NA LCS regular season
 5-6th — 2016 Spring NA LCS playoffs
 9th — 2016 NA LCS Summer regular season
 lost — 2017 Spring NA LCS promotion

References

Danish esports players
Living people
NRG Esports players
Team SoloMid players
Team Coast (esports) players
League of Legends jungle players
Place of birth missing (living people)
Year of birth missing (living people)